Rictaxiella joyae is a species of sea snail, a marine gastropod mollusk in the family Aplustridae.

Original description
    Poppe G.T., Tagaro S.P. & Chino M. (2011) Two new Rictaxiella (Gastropoda: Bullinidae) from the Philippines. Visaya 3(3): 76-82. [August 2011]
page(s): 77.

References

External links
 Worms Link

Aplustridae